Betty Nana Efua Krosbi (also spelled Crosby and Krosby) Mensah, (born August 29, 1980)  is a Ghanaian politician and the Member of Parliament for Afram Plains North constituency in the Eastern region of Ghana. She is a member of the National Democratic Congress.

Early life and education 
Mensah was born on 29 August 1980 in Donkorkrom, Eastern Region. She holds a bachelor's degree in Business Administration from the Zenith University College, and a Higher National Diploma (HND) in Accounting from Koforidua Technical University.

Career 
Before she became a Member of Parliament, Mensah was the managing director of Best Pat Ghana Limited from the year 2013 to the year 2016. She also served as the Second Deputy Coordinator for the National Youth Employment from 2009 to 2013. Mensah was also the Gender and Development Coordinator of Ghana Cooperative Credit Union from 2003 to 2005. She is the Vice President of the Young Parliamentarians Forum, Ghana Chapter.

Politics

Parliamentary bid 

In Ghana's 2016 general elections for the Parliamentary seat of Afram Plains, Mensah pulled a total vote count of 18,121 out of 23,606 votes cast representing 78.44% to beat Isaac Ofori-Koree of the New Patriotic Party who had 4,795 votes making 20.8% of the total votes cast, Cornelius Agbeku of the National Democratic Party who had 94 votes making 0.4% of the total votes cast, and Micheal Ampontia of the Convention People's Party who had 91 votes making 0.4% of the total votes cast to win the seat in 7th Parliament of the fourth Republic of Ghana.

2020 election 
In the 2020 Ghanaian general election, she again won the Afram Plains North Constituency parliamentary seat with 18,543 votes making 68.30% of the total votes cast whilst the NPP parliamentary candidate Isaac Ofori-Koree had 8,605 votes making 31.70% of the total votes cast and the NDP parliamentary candidate Ferguson Asare had 0 vote making 0% of the total votes cast.

Member of Parliament 
During the 8th parliament she serves a member on the Gender and Children Committee and Health Committee.

Personal life 
Mensah is married with one child. She is the daughter of Krosbi Mensah, the first MP for Afram Plains Constituency. She is a Christian and worships as a Roman Catholic.

Philanthropy 
In July 2021, Mensah donated a laptop to Michael Awingura, a student of the University of Ghana.

In June 2022, she donated materials to the educational sector, agricultural sector and hospital equipment to the health sector in the Afram Plains North Constituency.

References 

1980 births
Living people
National Democratic Congress (Ghana) politicians
21st-century Ghanaian women politicians
People from Eastern Region (Ghana)
Women members of the Parliament of Ghana
Ghanaian Christians
Ghanaian MPs 2017–2021
Ghanaian MPs 2021–2025
Ghanaian Roman Catholics